Uncommon may refer to:

Uncommon, 2015 American Christian drama film with Erik Estrada and Irma P. Hall 
"Uncommon", song by Madeline Kenney from Night Night at the First Landing 2017

See also
Common (disambiguation)